Hromkovič is a surname. Notable people with the surname include:

Juraj Hromkovič (born 1958), Slovak computer scientist and professor
Martin Hromkovič (born 1982), Slovak footballer

Slovak-language surnames